Sir Thomas Gooch, 2nd Baronet (1674–1754) was an English bishop.

Thomas Gooch may also refer to:

Thomas Longridge Gooch (1808–1882), civil engineer
Sir Thomas Gooch, 3rd Baronet (c. 1721–1781), of the Gooch baronets
Sir Thomas Gooch, 4th Baronet (1745–1826), of the Gooch baronets
Sir Thomas Gooch, 5th Baronet (1767–1851), of the Gooch baronets, MP for Suffolk
Sir Thomas Vere Sherlock Gooch, 10th Baronet (1881–1946), of the Gooch baronets
Thomas Gooch (artist) (1750–1802), English artist

See also
Gooch (disambiguation)